The dismal science is a derogatory term for the discipline of economics. Scottish essayist, historian and philosopher Thomas Carlyle used the phrase in his 1849 essay, Occasional Discourse on the Negro Question, in contrast with the then-familiar phrase "gay science" used to refer to the art of troubadours.

Origin

The phrase "the dismal science" first occurs in Thomas Carlyle's 1849 tract, "Occasional Discourse on the Negro Question", in which he argued in favor of reintroducing slavery in order to restore productivity to the West Indies: "Not a 'gay science', I should say, like some we have heard of; no, a dreary, desolate and, indeed, quite abject and distressing one; what we might call, by way of eminence, the dismal science."

Economics was "dismal" in "find[ing] the secret of this Universe in 'supply and demand', and reducing the duty of human governors to that of letting men alone" or personal freedom. Instead, the "idle black man in the West Indies" should be "compelled to work as he was fit, and to do the Maker's will who had constructed him". Carlyle also extended this imperative to other races.

Carlyle did not originally coin the phrase "dismal science" as a response to the economically-influential theories of Thomas Malthus, who predicted that starvation would inevitably result as projected population growth exceeded the rate of increase in the food supply.  However, Carlyle used the word "dismal" in relation to Malthus' theory in Chartism (1839): 

Carlyle's view was criticised by John Stuart Mill as making a virtue of toil itself, stunting the development of the weak, and committing the "vulgar error of imputing every difference which he finds among human beings to an original difference of nature".

Amongst those who were influenced by Carlyle's assessment was John Ruskin, who wrote that Carlyle had "led the way" for his own critique of political economy in Unto This Last (1860).

Beyond Carlyle
Many at the time and afterward have understood the phrase in relation to the grim predictions drawn from the principles of 19th century political economy. According to Humphry House:

(Ricardo, however, did not believe that wages must always fall to the minimum. He believed that they were a function of the margin of production.)

In modern terms, the phrase is sometimes referenced by synonymous terms like "the miserable science", as shown in this quote by E. W. Dijkstra: "As economics is known as 'The Miserable Science', software engineering should be known as 'The Doomed Discipline'".

See also 
An Essay on the Principle of Population
Critique of political economy
Illth – a term of Ruskin's used to contrast the "wealth" that could be created by government with the "anarchy" created by laissez-faire
Malthusian growth model – the math behind the theory
Malthusianism – political (and economic) fallout from the theory

References

External links
 

Economics catchphrases
Criticisms of economics
Thomas Carlyle